Alamgir may refer to:

People
Aurangzeb (1618–1707), also known as Alamgir, ruler of the Mughal Empire 1658–1707
Alamgir II (1699–1759), also known as Aziz-ud-Din, ruler of the Mughal Empire 1754–1759
Alamgir Hashmi (born 1951), English avant-garde poet
Alamgir Haq (born 1955), pioneer of pop music in Pakistan, known mononymously as Alamgir
Alamgir (actor) (born 1950), Bangladeshi actor

Pakistan Navy warships
PNS Alamgir (F260), a U.S. Navy, Oliver Hazard Perry class frigate transferred to the Pakistan Navy
PNS Alamgir (D160), U.S. Navy, Gearing class destroyer transferred to the Pakistan Navy

Other
Alamgir, Bhogpur, a village in the Indian state of Punjab